The 1825 Missouri gubernatorial special election was held on December 8, 1825, to determine who would fill the remainder of the term of Frederick Bates who had died on August 4, 1825. Governor Abraham J. Williams (who succeeded Bates) did not stand for election and John Miller was elected over William Carr, David Todd, and Missouri Attorney General Rufus Easton.

Results

References

Missouri
1825
Gubernatorial
December 1825 events
Missouri 1825